Scrobipalpa sindibad is a moth in the family Gelechiidae. It was described by Povolný in 1981. It is found in Iraq.

The forewings are cream light to chocolate brownish. The three tribal marks are represented by blackish to black groups of scales. The hindwings are whitish, but the veins and tips are darkened with grey.

References

Scrobipalpa
Moths described in 1981